Troy Miller is an American film producer, director and screenwriter. He is best known for his work in comedy. Miller is known as an innovator in alternative comedy, and has directed four feature films as well as directing and producing numerous TV shows and specials.

Career 

Miller directed the Mark Twain Prize for American Humor Mark Twain Prize with Julia Louis-Dreyfus at the Kennedy Center and produced the 2018 and 2019 seasons of Arrested Development,  for Netflix. Miller produced and directed all episodes of Brian Regan's Stand-up and Away with Brian Regan for Netflix. George Lopez: The Wall, live comedy concert for HBO. Another live special for HBO featured Bill Maher closing his HBO series, then on to a live stand up special Bill Maher: Live from DC. Comedy Central's first-ever live standup special was Brian Regan Live From Radio City Music Hall, produced and directed by Miller. Miller produced and directed the first season of Hulu's Deadbeat. Deadbeat premiered on April 9, 2014, to positive reviews and was #1 site-wide the day it dropped on Hulu. Currently, Miller has several projects in development through his production shingle Dakota Pictures. Prior to Arrested, he also executive produced and directed HBO's George Lopez: It's Not Me, It's You, a live comedy concert and one of HBO's most watched events of 2012. Miller has produced and/or directed specials for a variety of many other comedians including Robin Williams, Martin Short, Katt Williams, Jim Gaffigan, Brian Regan, Dave Chappelle, David Cross, Kathleen Madigan, Jeff Garlin, and David Alan Grier. Also in 2012, Miller created / executive produced (with Russell Brand), Brand X With Russell Brand for FX. In its second season BrandX became FX's first weekly live series (also directed by Miller).

Miller has produced and directed short- and long-form programming for all of the major networks (ABC, NBC, CBS, Fox) and cable outlets such as MTV, Comedy Central, Bravo, TBS, Disney XD, and many others including the BBC. Some notable projects from Miller's past include Mr. Show and Tenacious D for HBO, on which Miller served as both executive producer and director. In 2003, Miller created Viva La Bam along with celebrity skater Bam Margera for MTV; by 2005 it was the most watched cable show for teens aged 12–18. Miller's first industry job was as an intern on the show Fridays, working under the tutelage of comics such as Rich Hall, Larry David and Andy Kaufman. Miller directed all episodes in the first two seasons of the Emmy-nominated Tracey Ullman's State of the Union for Showtime, and regularly directs episodes of NBC's Parks and Recreation and The Office. Miller is executive producer and one of the directors for both seasons of the acclaimed shows Flight of the Conchords as well as HBO's Bored to Death. Other credits include EP/Director/Creator of FX's BrandX with Russell Brand as well as Parks and Recreation, The Office, and New Girl.

Miller has also produced and directed eight opening films for the Academy Awards Oscar telecast, including those featuring Billy Crystal, Jon Stewart, James Franco and Anne Hathaway. He is the creator of this "short film opening award show format" that ultimately began with the MTV Movie Awards. His films have served as the opening for twenty awards shows. Miller is one of the creators of the short-form genre of films that have become common in award show openings. Having produced and directed many MTV Movie Awards opens, including the two most recent shows hosted by Conan O'Brien and Rebel Wilson respectively. Miller produced and directed all of the short films that have opened the Oscar telecast. The 84th annual show featured Tom Cruise and George Clooney and again featured Billy Crystal (embedded within the footage of other films). In 2006, Jon Stewart used Miller to construct his Oscar open which featured Clooney, Chris Rock, Halle Berry, Steve Martin and David Letterman. Miller also directed the opening film for the 83rd Academy Awards parodying Inception, featuring hosts Franco and Hathaway embedded in Best Picture nominees and cameo appearances by Alec Baldwin and Morgan Freeman. Miller also crafted the opening film for Bette Midler's Las Vegas stage show, The Showgirl Must Go On as well as has directed well a huge array of other short films for various sketch programs and live presentations and film festivals.

The director of four feature films, Miller is probably best known for directing the seasonal film Jack Frost, starring Michael Keaton. Miller also produced and directed the Mr. Show spin-off movie Run Ronnie Run!. Among other features and movie-of-the-week productions, Miller also directed Dumb and Dumberer: When Harry Met Lloyd, a moderate commercial success in first release. The film was poorly received by critics, but it went on to earn upwards of $80 million in international box office.

Filmography

Standup comedy 
 Jeff Dunham Beside Himself (Netflix) 2019
 The Standups 2.0 (Netflix) 2018
 George Lopez The Wall - Live (HBO) 2017
 Brian Regan Nunchucks and Flamethrowers (Netflix) 2017
 Brian Regan Live From Rockefeller Plaza (Comedy Central) 2016
 The Standups 1.0 (Netflix) 2016
 Natasha Leggero (Comedy Central) 2015
 Bill Maher: Live from D.C. (HBO) 2014
 George Lopez: It's Not Me, It's You (HBO) 2012
 Bill Maher: CrazyStupidPolitics - Live from Silicon Valley (Yahoo) 2012
 David Alan Grier: Comedy You Can Believe In (TBS) 2009
 Martin Short: Let Freedom Hum (TBS) 2009
 Jim Gaffigan: King Baby (Comedy Central) 2009
 Jo Koy: Don't Make Him Angry (Comedy Central) 2009
 Katt Williams: It's Pimpin Pimpin 2008
 Brian Regan: The Epitome of Hyperbole (Comedy Central) 2008
 John Oliver: Terrifying Times (Comedy Central) 2008
 David Cross: The Pride Is Back (HBO) 1999
 George Carlin: Playin' With Your Head (MPI Home Video) 1986
 The Young Comedians All-Star Reunion (HBO) 1986
 Robin Williams: An Evening at the Met (HBO) 1986
 Don Rickles: Rickles on the Loose (Showtime) 1986

Episodic television 
 Arrested Development (Netflix) 18 episodes, 2018
 Lopez (TV Land) 10 episodes, 2016
 Deadbeat (Hulu) 10 episodes, 2015
 Brooklyn Nine-Nine (Fox) 1 episode, 2013
 The Goldbergs (ABC) 1 episode, 2013
 Arrested Development (Netflix) 16 episodes, 2013-2015
 Brand X with Russell Brand (FX) 26 episodes, 2012-2013
 The Office (NBC) 3 episodes, 2011-2013 
 New Girl (FOX) 1 episode, 2012
 Underemployed (MTV) 3 episodes, 2012
 Breaking In (FOX) 1 episode, 2012
 The L.A. Complex (CW) 4 episodes, 2012
 Best Friends Forever (NBC), 2012
 Up All Night (NBC) 4 episodes, 2011-2012
 Eagleheart (Adult Swim) 1 episode, 2011
 Parks and Recreation (NBC) 7 episodes, 2009-2012
 Greg and Donny (IFC) 1 episode, 2011 
 Raising Hope (Fox) 1 episode, 2011
 Happy Endings (ABC) 1 episode, 2011
 Outsourced (NBC) 1 episode, 2011
 Perfect Couples (NBC) 1 episode, 2011
 Running Wilde (FX) 3 episodes, 2010-2011
 Bored to Death (HBO) 15 episodes, 2009-2011
 Tracey Ullman's State of the Union (Showtime) 5 episodes, 2008-2010
 Wait Wait... Don't Tell Me! (CBS) 2008
 Flight of the Conchords (HBO) 2007-2009 
 Just For Laughs (ABC) 3 episodes, 2007
 The Showbiz Show with David Spade (Comedy Central) 1 episode, 2005
 Viva La Bam (MTV) 39 episodes, 2003-2005 
 Reel Comedy (Comedy Central) 1 episode, 2002
 Greg The Bunny (FOX) 2002
 Tenacious D (HBO) 2 episodes, 1999-2000
 HBO Comedy Half-Hour (HBO) 2 episodes, 1997-1998
 Mr. Show with Bob and David (HBO) 34 episodes, 1995-1998
 The Jenny McCarthy Show (MTV) 3 episodes, 1997
 Saturday Night Special (FOX) 2 episodes, 1996
 The Bill Bellamy Show (MTV) 1 episode, 1996
 Weird Science (USA) 3 episodes, 1995
 Running the Halls (NBC) 1 episode, 1993
 The Ben Stiller Show (FOX) 7 episodes, 1992
 Arresting Behavior (ABC) 1 episode, 1992
 The Real World (MTV) 13 episodes, 1992 
 The Sunday Comics (FOX) 1 episode, 1991
 Pee Wee's Playhouse (CBS) 45 episodes, 1986-1991
 SK8 TV (MTV) 1 episode, 1990
 Not Necessarily The News (HBO) 60 episodes, 1982-1990
 The Super Mario Bros. Super Show! (DiC) 65 episodes, 1989
 Madame's Place (Comedy Central) 31 episodes, 1982
 Fridays (ABC) 1 episode, 1980

TV movies 
 Wyclef Jean in America (HBO) 2008
 Like Father, Like Sunday (Comedy Central) 2006
 Van Stone: Tour of Duty 2006 
 Celebrity Autobiography: In Their Own Words (Bravo) 2005
 The Show with A.J. Calloway (Sony Pictures TV) 2005
 David Blaine: Vertigo (Virgil Films) 2002
 Super Nerds (Comedy Central) 2000
 Mr. Show and the Incredible, Fantastical New Report (HBO) 1998
 Save Our Streets (NBC) 1997
 Beverly Hills Family Robinson (ABC) 1997
 Mr. Show with Bob and David: Fantastic Newness (HBO) 1996
 Best Defense (CBS) 1994
 Madonna: Blond Ambition World Tour Live (Pioneer Artists) 1990
 Tales from the Whoop: Hot Rod Brown Class Clown (MTV) 1990
 Christmas at Pee Wee's Playhouse (CBS) 1988
 Harry Anderson's Hello Sucker (Showtime) 1986
 Mystery Magical Special (Nickelodeon) 1986

 Short films 

 2014 MTV Movie Awards (MTV) 2014
 The 65th Primetime Emmy Awards (CBS) 2013 
 2013 MTV Movie Awards (MTV) 2013
 The 84th Academy Awards (ABC) 2012
 The 63rd Primetime Emmy Awards (FOX) 2011
 2011 MTV Movie Awards (MTV) 2011
 The 83rd Academy Awards (ABC) 2011
 2010 MTV Movie Awards (MTV) 2010
 2009 MTV Movie Awards (MTV) 2009
 2008 MTV Movie Awards (MTV) 2008
 The 78th Academy Awards (ABC) 2006
 The 76th Academy Awards (ABC) 2004
 The 72nd Academy Awards (ABC) 2000
 1999 MTV Movie Awards (MTV) 1999
 The 70th Academy Awards (ABC) 1998
 The 69th Academy Awards (ABC) 1997
 1997 MTV Movie Awards (MTV) 1997
 1996 MTV Movie Awards (MTV) 1996
 1995 MTV Movie Awards (MTV) 1995
 1993 MTV Movie Awards (MTV) 1993

 Feature films 
 Kathy Griffin: A Hell of a Story (Fathom) 2019
 Dumb and Dumberer: When Harry Met Lloyd (New Line) 2003
 Run Ronnie Run! (New Line) 2002
 The Announcement (BBC) 2000
 Jack Frost (Warner Brothers) 1998

 Awards 
Primetime Emmy Award Nominee 
The 83rd Annual Academy Awards (ABC) 2011 - Outstanding Short-Form Picture Editing Flight of The Conchords'' (HBO) 2009 - Outstanding Comedy Series
The 78th Annual Academy Awards (ABC) 2006 - Outstanding Picture Editing for a Special (Single or Multi-Camera) 
The 76th Annual Academy Awards (ABC) 2004 - Outstanding Multi-Camera Picture Editing for a Miniseries, Movie or a Special

Daytime Emmy Award Nominee
Tales from the Whoop: Hot Rod Brown Class Clown (MTV) 1991 - Outstanding Children's Special

CableACE Awards Nominee
1993 MTV Movie Awards (MTV) 1993 - Variety Special or Series

References

External links
 

American film directors
American television directors
American television producers
Year of birth missing (living people)
Living people
Los Angeles Valley College people